Friedrich Schütter (1921–1995) was a German film and television actor. He was the German dubbing voice of Lorne Greene.

Selected filmography
 Operation Sleeping Bag (1955)
 The Heart of St. Pauli (1957)
 Doctor Crippen Lives (1958)
 The Crimson Circle (1960)
 The Counterfeit Traitor (1962)
 When Night Falls on the Reeperbahn (1967)
 Death in the Red Jaguar (1968)
 The Doctor of St. Pauli (1968)
 On the Reeperbahn at Half Past Midnight (1969)
 Das Millionenspiel (1970)
 Tatort: Reifezeugnis (1979)

Television appearances
 Maximilian von Mexiko
 Sir Roger Casement

External links
 

1921 births
1995 deaths
German male film actors
German male television actors
German male voice actors
Actors from Düsseldorf
20th-century German male actors
Officers Crosses of the Order of Merit of the Federal Republic of Germany